Echinolittorina mespillum is a species of sea snail, a marine gastropod mollusk in the family Littorinidae, the winkles or periwinkles.

Distribution
Aruba, Bonaire, Caribbean Sea, Cayman Islands, Colombia, Cuba, Curaçao, Gulf of Mexico, Jamaica, Lesser Antilles, Mexico, Puerto Rico

Description 
The maximum recorded shell length is 10 mm.

Habitat 
Minimum recorded depth is −2 m. Maximum recorded depth is 0 m.

References

Littorinidae
Gastropods described in 1824